The Local Government Finance Act 1988 introduced significant reforms to local taxation in the United Kingdom (except Northern Ireland).  The old systems of rates were replaced by the Community Charge (for individuals) and business rates (for businesses).  The Community Charge was extremely unpopular, leading to the poll tax riots of 1990, and contributing to the resignation of Margaret Thatcher as Prime Minister later that year.

The sections of the Act pertaining to the Community Charge were repealed by the Local Government Finance Act 1992, which introduced the new Council Tax as a replacement from 1993.

Section 114 
A Section 114 Notice is issued by a public body's Chief Finance Officer (or Section 151 officer) to prevent any new expenditure, other than funding statutory services. It takes its name from Section 114(3) of the act. Section 114 notices have been issued by Hackney Council in 2000, Northamptonshire Council twice in 2018, Croydon Council in 2020, Slough Council in 2021, and Thurrock Council in 2022.

References

External links 

United Kingdom Acts of Parliament 1988
Local government legislation in England and Wales
Local taxation in the United Kingdom